China Huabiao Film Awards, also simply known as Huabiao Awards, is an annual awards ceremony for Chinese cinema. Named after the decorative Chinese winged columns (huabiaos), The Huabiao Awards were first instituted in 1957 as the Ministry of Culture Excellence Film awards. Between 1958 and 1979, no awards were given. In 1994, the awards were renamed "Huabiao." The ceremony is held in Beijing, and is the highest government honor in the film industry. Along with the Golden Rooster Awards and Hundred Flowers Awards, these are known as China's three main film awards.

Unlike other award ceremonies, Huabiao Awards for individual categories are often given to multiple nominees.

Ceremonies

Categories
Outstanding Film
Outstanding Producer
Outstanding Director
Outstanding Writer
Outstanding Actor
Outstanding Actress
Outstanding New Actor
Outstanding New Actress
Outstanding Animation
Outstanding Documentary

See also
Golden Rooster Awards
Hundred Flowers Awards
Shanghai Film Critics Awards

External links
Huabiao Film Awards at the Internet Movie Database

Chinese film awards
Awards established in 1957
1957 establishments in China
Recurring events established in 1957
Annual events in China